The Speaker of the House of Representatives,is the presiding officer of the House of Representatives of Indonesia. The speaker is the political and parliamentary leader of the House of Representatives and is simultaneously the Council's presiding officer. The speakers also perform various other administrative and procedural functions.

Duties 
The duties of the speaker have been determined on 22 October 2019 through the Decree of the House of Representatives of the Republic of Indonesia Number 34/DPR RI/I/2019-2020 concerning the Division of Duties of the Leaders of the DPR RI for the 2019-2024 Membership Period. The duties of the Chairperson of the DPR RI are general in nature and cover all Coordination Fields, namely :

 Coordinator for Political and Security Affairs (Korpolkam) in charge of the scope of duties of Commission I, Commission II, Commission III, Inter-Parliamentary Cooperation Agency, and the Legislative Body.
 Coordinator for Economics and Finance (Korekku) in charge of the scope of duties of Commission XI, the Budget Agency, and the State Financial Accountability Agency.
 Coordinator for Industry and Development (Korinbang) in charge of the scope of duties of Commission IV, Commission V, Commission VI, and Commission VII.
 People's Welfare Coordinator (Kokesra) in charge of the scope of duties of Commission VIII, Commission IX, Commission X, the Honorary Court of the Council, and the Household Affairs Agency.

List of speakers
This is a list of speakers of the House of Representatives, the lower house of Indonesia : 

Legend:

See also 
 House of Representatives
 List of deputy speakers of the People's Representative Council
 List of speakers of the People's Consultative Assembly
 List of speakers of the Regional Representative Council of Indonesia

Notes

References 

Lists of legislative speakers
Lists of political office-holders in Indonesia